The men's sabre fencing competition at the 2008 Summer Olympics in Beijing took place on August 12 at the Olympic Green Convention Centre. There were 40 competitors from 21 nations. The event was won by Zhong Man of China, the nation's first medal in the men's sabre. Nicolas Lopez's silver put France back on the podium after a one-Games absence. Mihai Covaliu of Romania became the 13th man to win multiple medals in the event, adding a bronze to his 2000 gold medal.

Background

This was the 26th appearance of the event, which is the only fencing event to have been held at every Summer Olympics. Five of the quarterfinalists from 2004 returned: gold medalist Aldo Montano of Italy, silver medalist Zsolt Nemcsik of Hungary, bronze medalist Dmitry Lapkes of Belarus, sixth-place finisher (and 1996 gold medalist) Stanislav Pozdnyakov of Russia, and seventh-place finisher (and 2000 gold medalist) Mihai Covaliu of Romania. Since the last Games, Covaliu had won the 2005 world championship and Pozdnyakov had added two more world championships (2006 and 2007) to his resume (1997, 2001, and 2002 worlds along with the 1996 Olympic gold). Pozdnyakov was favored once again, though he had been upset early in both the 2000 and 2004 Games.

Burkina Faso and Senegal each made their debut in the men's sabre. Italy made its 24th appearance in the event, most of any nation, having missed the inaugural 1896 event and the 1904 Games.

Qualification

Nations had been limited to three fencers each since 1928. However, the 2008 Games introduced a rotation of men's team fencing events with one weapon left off each Games; the individual event without a corresponding team event had the number of fencers per nation reduced to two. Men's foil was the first event to which this applied to, so the 2008 individual sabre competition continued to allow three fencers per nation.

There were 39 dedicated quota spots for men's sabre. The 24 fencers from the 8 teams qualified for the team event were all automatically qualified for the individual event. Next, the top 3 men in the FIE Individual Ranking received spots. After that, 7 more men were selected from the ranking based on continents: 2 from Europe, 2 from the Americas, 2 from Asia/Oceania, and 1 from Africa; each nation could only earn one spot from this continental ranking, but it could be added to any spots from the world ranking (up to three total). Finally, five spots were allocated by continental qualifying events: 2 from Europe, 1 from the Americas, 1 from Asia/Oceania, and 1 from Africa. Nations could only earn one spot from these events and only if they had no fencer qualified through rankings.

Additionally, there were 8 host/invitational spots that could be spread throughout the various fencing events. China used only 2 of those places to max out its representation in all events, so 6 spots were assigned by Tripartite Commission invitation. One was used in the men's sabre (for Julien Ouedraogo of Burkina Faso).

Competition format

The sabre competition consisted of a five-round single-elimination bracket with a bronze medal match between the two semifinal losers. Fencing was done to 15 touches or to the completion of three three-minute rounds if neither fencer reached 15 touches by then. At the end of time, the higher-scoring fencer was the winner; a tie resulted in an additional one-minute sudden-death time period. This sudden-death period was further modified by the selection of a draw-winner beforehand; if neither fencer scored a touch during the minute, the predetermined draw-winner won the bout.

Schedule

All times are China Standard Time (UTC+8)

Results

Section 1

Section 2

Section 3

Section 4

Finals

Final classification

References

 Competition format

Fencing at the 2008 Summer Olympics
Men's events at the 2008 Summer Olympics